Conneaut may refer to:

Conneaut Creek, which flows through northwestern Pennsylvania and northeastern Ohio to Lake Erie
Conneaut Lake, a natural lake in Crawford County, Pennsylvania, which drains south through the Conneaut Marsh
Conneaut, Ohio, a city
Conneaut Lake, Pennsylvania, a borough
Conneaut Lakeshore, Pennsylvania, a census-designated place
Conneautville, Pennsylvania, a borough
Conneaut Township, Crawford County, Pennsylvania
Conneaut Township, Erie County, Pennsylvania